KALV (1430 AM) is a radio station licensed to serve Alva, Oklahoma, United States. The station, established in 1956, is currently owned by Remember Radio, LLC. 

KALV broadcasts a progressive country format of new and classic country with State news from the Oklahoma News Network and Agriculture News from First OK AG. Weekend shows include Red Steagall's Cowboy Corner and the Sunday Night KALV Sock Hop.

Translators

References

External links

ALV (AM)
Radio stations established in 1956
Woods County, Oklahoma
1956 establishments in Oklahoma